Albert le Tyrant (born 12 September 1946) is a French archer. He competed in the men's individual event at the 1976 Summer Olympics.

References

External links
 

1946 births
Living people
French male archers
Olympic archers of France
Archers at the 1976 Summer Olympics
Place of birth missing (living people)